John Burleton Jones-Bateman (21 June 1825 – 29 December 1910) was an English cricketer. Jones-Bateman's batting style is unknown.

Jones-Bateman was born at St Pancras, London. He was educated at Winchester College and later attended Gonville and Caius College, Cambridge, where he studied theology. While studying he played a single first-class cricket match for Cambridge University against Oxford University at the Magdalen Ground in 1848. In a match which won by Oxford University by 23 runs, Jones-Bateman was dismissed for ducks in both innings, being dismissed in Cambridge University's first-innings by Charles Willis, while in their second he was dismissed by Gerald Yonge. His brother Rowland Jones-Bateman played for Oxford University in this match. After his degree ended in 1848, he was ordained as a deacon and priest. In 1849 he was nominated by a private patron to the rectory of Sheldon, Warwickshire, a position he held for 61 years. He died at Sheldon on 29 December 1910.

References

External links
John Jones-Bateman at ESPNcricinfo
John Jones-Bateman at CricketArchive

1825 births
1910 deaths
People from St Pancras, London
People educated at Winchester College
Alumni of Gonville and Caius College, Cambridge
English cricketers
Cambridge University cricketers
19th-century English Anglican priests